Paul Frederick Irizarry Suau, (born January 18, 1982), known professionally as Echo, is a Puerto Rican record producer and songwriter.

Grammy Award-winning producer and engineer, Paul Irizarry “Echo” has successfully worked for the last 15 years with major urban and pop artists in Latin, mainstream, and European markets.

Musical career
Producing, recording and/or mixing songs and albums for the likes of such artists as: Ricky Martin, Pitbull, London Symphony Orchestra, Tego Calderon, Nicole Scherzinger (Pussycat Dolls), Alek Syntek, Paulina Rubio, Tempo, Daddy Yankee, Don Omar, Vico C, Divino, Ivy Queen, Thalia, Nina Sky, Wisin & Yandel, Voltio, Tito El Bambino, Farruko, FLEX, Beenie Man, Cultura Profética, Alexis & Fido, Cosculluela, Orishas, Jazze Pha, Obie Bermúdez, Lil Silvio & El Vega, Kevin Florez, Twista, Abraham, Fat Joe, Ariana Puello (Spain), La Mala (Spain), Ojos de Brujo (Spain), PUYA, La Secta, Crooked Steelo, La India, Eddie Dee, Hector “El Father”, y Giovanni Hidalgo to name a few.

Echo's experience and expert knowledge and taste for music have allowed him the opportunity to work in different musical genres and tendencies, ranging from Pop, R&B, Hip Hop, Reggaeton and Christian Music. One of the top professionals in the industry, respected for his talent and accomplishments, known as a leader and pioneer of the Latin urban and reggaeton movement. Echo has received three Latin Grammy Awards, the first two for, as producer and engineer, on 2004 Vico C's (EMI Int'l) 2003 album "En Honor a la Verdad" and the other in 2005 with Daddy Yankee's (UMG) 2004 album "Barrio Fino".

Echo has been nominated for over ten Grammy Awards including Record of the Year. In 2006 Echo became the first producer to ever record the London Symphony Orchestra (LSO) for an urban project, directing a 73-piece full orchestra recording on a hip hop arrangement at Abbey Roads Studios, London for the FREE TEMPO (Sony/BMG) project. Responsible for creating career-making hits for the biggest artists in the urban market like Wisin & Yandel, Tego Calderón, Don Omar, Vico C, Daddy Yankee, Tempo, Ivy Queen and many others. Movies like “The Fast and the Furious 3, 4, 5, and 6 sequel”, “Talento de Barrio”, TV shows “Shark” (HBO), " The L Word (HBO)", games like “Grand Theft Auto IV” as well as advertisement campaigns for Nike, Popular Mortgage, KIA Motors and many others have featured Echo's music and work.

As an accomplished businessman, he currently owns and operates a state of the art recording and production facility in San Juan, Puerto Rico, called THE LAB STUDIOS. From there he leads a world known production team consisting of a handful of young and talented engineers, songwriters, and producers who work with Echo making hits and creating classics on a daily basis. Currently working on new releases by Tego Calderón, De La Ghetto, J King & Maximan, Pitbull and others.

Recently, he has been nominated for the 2020 Latin Grammy Awards for the production of the song "Muchacha" by Gente de Zona and Becky G.

Discography
 Echo Presenta: Invasion (2007)

Productions Record Labels 
 2002: Reggaeton Sex Crew
 2004: Clase Aparte
 2004: Barrio Fino
 2004: En Honor A La Verdad
 2005: Los Bandoleros
 2005: Desahogo
 2006: Los Bandoleros Reloaded
 2006: Top Of The Line
 2007: El Cartel III: The Big Boss
 2007: Top Of The Line: El Internacional
 2007: La Iglesia de la Calle
2008: Los 4 Fantastikos: Los Presidentes
2008: Mi Primer Capitulo
 2009: El Príncipe
 2009: El Principe: Ghost Edition
 2009: IDon
 2009: Free Tempo 
 2009: Mi Primer Capitulo: Edición Especial
 2010: Por experiencias Propias
 2010: Los SuperHeroes
 2013: Free Music
 2015: Vendetta
 2015: Los Reyes Del Rap

References

Living people
Puerto Rican people of Basque descent
Puerto Rican reggaeton musicians
Reggaeton record producers
Place of birth missing (living people)
1982 births